Public Safety Building may refer to:

Public Safety Building (Cumberland, Maryland)
Public Safety Building (Winnipeg)